Big Trick Energy is an American comedy television series starring Chris Ramsay, Eric Leclerc, Alex Boyer and Wes Barker. The series premiered on TruTV on April 22, 2021.

Episodes

References

External links
 
 

2020s American comedy television series
2020s American reality television series
American television magic shows
American hidden camera television series
2021 American television series debuts
English-language television shows
TruTV original programming